Graham McGregor may refer to:

 Graham McGregor (politician), Canadian politician
 Graham MacGregor Bull, South African-British physician
 Graham McGregor, musician from the band Fiction Factory